"Yonder Comes a Sucker" is a song written and originally recorded for RCA by Jim Reeves. It was released as a single in summer 1955.

References

1955 songs
1955 singles
RCA Victor singles
Songs written by Jim Reeves
Jim Reeves songs